When the Spanish Air Force was created in 1940, an anthem was created, but was changed in 1967 to what is currently sung today. It was created by José María Pemán and Ricardo Dorado and was chosen among 198 other works presented to a competition call by the Spanish Air Ministry.

See also 
Spanish Air and Space Force

External links 
Spanish Air Force Anthem (Unofficial site)
MP3 file

1967 compositions
Spanish military marches
Spanish Air and Space Force